Don Nichols (November 23, 1924 – August 21, 2017) was the founder and former principal of the Shadow CanAm and Formula One racing team.

Biography
Nichols, a U.S. Army combat veteran of World War II and Korea who then served in Military Intelligence, later found success as an entrepreneur in Japan before returning to the U.S. and setting up his own company called Advanced Vehicle Systems in 1968. In 1970 he raced his first CanAm car. He decided to call it Shadow, with the team's logo featuring a cloaked spy. Jackie Oliver won the CanAm title for Shadow in 1974. With major sponsorship from Universal Oil Products, Nichols expanded his operation and entered F1 at the start of 1973 with Oliver and George Follmer driving. In 1975 Oliver became the team's commercial director, but the original sponsor pulled out and could not be adequately replaced. In 1977 most of the team management walked out of Shadow to join the Arrows team. Nichols sued and won, claiming copyright infringement, and that year Alan Jones scored Shadow's single Grand Prix victory. Shadow was in financial decline, however, and in 1981 Nichols sold his assets to the Theodore team of Chinese businessman Teddy Yip. He died at the age of 92 on August 21, 2017.

References

1924 births
2017 deaths
American motorsport people
Formula One team owners
Formula One team principals
United States Army personnel of World War II
United States Army personnel of the Korean War